Alum Rock is an inner-city suburb of Birmingham, England, located roughly 2 miles east of Birmingham city centre. The area is officially a division of Saltley. Alum Rock Road is located here and has many Pakistani clothing shops and restaurants.

Neighbouring areas 

Alum Rock includes the connecting streets of the 3 km Alum Rock Road beginning at Saltley Gate and ending at Railway Bridge. Once through the main shopping area, Alum Rock Road continues towards Stechford, passing through Pelham, before joining Washwood Heath Road at the Fox & Goose the eastern part of the main road is in Ward End.

The area locally known as "The Rock" starts at Saltley Gate and ends at the junction with Highfield Road and Bowyer Road. 

Singer-songwriter and founding member of Duran Duran, Stephen Duffy, was born and brought up in Alum Rock.

Rockwood Academy is a secondary school located in the area. 

Alum Rock covers most of Saltley and so runs into many of Saltley's neighbouring areas, Bordesley Green to the south, Ward End to the north and east and Nechells to the west.

Washwood Heath Road, which also begins at Saltley Gate, runs loosely parallel to Alum Rock Road for a mile, before both main roads join up in front of the Fox & Goose.

Administrative area and census information
Until 2018 Alum Rock was part of the Washwood Heath ward. Following boundary changes in 2018 the area is now included in eponymous Alum Rock ward.

Census Data from the 2001 Census identifies the ward as having a higher population density, lower average age and a significantly higher ethnic minority population against the Birmingham average.

Community organisations
The Saltley Gate Peace Group is an organisation based in Alum Rock, taking its name from the local roundabout which leads to the areas main shopping area, Alum Rock road.

Buildings 

 Brookhill Tavern, a Grade II listed pub

Politics
Alum Rock ward is served by two Labour councillors; Mohammed Idrees and Mariam Khan.

Schools 

Schools in Alum Rock include:
 Rockwood Academy
 Shaw Hill Primary School

Sports
The Alum rock area has its own football club. Set up in the 90s by the late Farid Raja, Alum Rock FC takes part in the South Birmingham Football League every season. The club is now looking to expand and include youth teams along with its senior First XI.

References

Areas of Birmingham, West Midlands
A
Alum Rock, Birmingham
Restaurant districts and streets in England